Jean-Yves Lacoste is a French philosopher. Lacoste is associated with what Dominique Janicaud called the "theological turn in phenomenology", along with other influential French phenomenologists like Michel Henry, Jean-Luc Marion and Jean-Louis Chrétien. Lacoste's work straddles philosophy and theology, and displays an interest in what might be called postmodern themes. He works in Paris and Cambridge and has a life membership at Clare Hall, Cambridge.

Lacoste's influential 1994 book Experience and the Absolute argues against the modern prizing of "religious experience" and defends the view that God is knowable as lovable but does not give himself by way of experience or feeling.

In 2010, Lacoste delivered the James W. Richards lectures at the University of Virginia while he was a Visiting Professor of Religious Studies. His paper, "From Theology to Theological Thinking", called for erasing rigid distinctions between philosophical and theological disciplines.

Publications
 Note sur le temps: Essai sur les raisons de la mémoire et de l'espérance, Paris, PUF,1990.
 Expérience et absolu: Questions disputées sur l'humanité de l'homme (Experience and the Absolute: Disputed Questions on the Humanity of Man), Paris, PUF, 1994.
 Le Monde et l'absence d'oeuvre, Paris, PUF, 2000.
 Dictionnaire critique de théologie, ed., Encyclopedia of Christian Theology, New York : Routledge, 2005
 La phénoménalité de Dieu : Neuf études, Paris, Cerf, 2008.
 Être en danger, Paris, Cerf, 2011.

Notes

External links

Year of birth missing (living people)
Living people
French Christian theologians
20th-century French theologians
French philosophers
21st-century French theologians